Stars Over Hollywood is an American anthology series of "original comedies and light dramas" produced by Revue Productions.  Revue's first television series, it was a filmed in Hollywood and aired on the National Broadcasting Company (NBC) from September 6, 1950 to August 29, 1951.  There were a total of 50 episodes. 

Among the guest stars were Mary Stuart in the premiere presentation "Beauty Is a Joy", Raymond Burr, Cameron Mitchell (actor), Ann Rutherford, and Bruce Cabot. Otherwise, the program was described in one TV reference book as "generally featuring lesser-known actors and actresses. In 1950, media critic John Crosby wrote: "Stars Over Hollywood is the latest of the programs filmed especially for television in Hollywood and has all the conspicuous weaknesses of the others. ... All the TV productions emanating from Hollywood are slipshod. The actors seem insufficiently rehearsed; the quality of the writing is painfully bad; the casting seems to have been done out of card catalogues, and the direction, to put it mildly, is superficial." At the time, most of the network programming originated from New York City, with Hollywood-produced programs generally regarded as inferior to New York productions. This began to change around the time that series like well-received Hollywood series like Four Star Playhouse (1952-1956) came along. 

Stars Over Hollywoods producer was Axel Gruenberg. He and Jack Hively were writers for the program. Armour and Company was the sponsor.

Rod Serling's first script, "Grady Everett for the People," was presented on the program in 1950.

Episodes of Stars Over Hollywood were part of a syndicated syndication package, Famous Playhouse, that was distributed by MCA Inc. in 1953. Other programs in the package were Chevron Theater and Gruen Theater.

References

External links
 
 Stars Over Hollywood at CTVA with list of episodes

1950s American anthology television series
1950 American television series debuts
1951 American television series endings
NBC original programming
Black-and-white American television shows